Onychobaris is a genus of flower weevils in the beetle family Curculionidae. There are more than 40 described species in Onychobaris.

Species
These 48 species belong to the genus Onychobaris:

 Onychobaris alutacea Hustache, 1951
 Onychobaris amazonica Casey, 1922
 Onychobaris ambigua Casey, 1892
 Onychobaris arguta Casey, 1892
 Onychobaris armipes Solari & F., 1906
 Onychobaris audax Casey, 1892
 Onychobaris austera Casey, 1892
 Onychobaris cernua Casey, 1920
 Onychobaris chihuahuae Casey, 1920
 Onychobaris corrosa Casey, 1892
 Onychobaris cribrata LeConte & J.L., 1876
 Onychobaris densa (LeConte, 1858)
 Onychobaris dentitibia Solari & F., 1906
 Onychobaris depressa Casey, 1892
 Onychobaris diluta Casey, 1892
 Onychobaris distans (LeConte, 1868)
 Onychobaris egena Casey, 1892
 Onychobaris fulvescens Hustache, 1924
 Onychobaris ilex Casey, 1892
 Onychobaris illex Casey & T.L., 1892
 Onychobaris implicata Casey, 1920
 Onychobaris insidiosa Casey, 1892
 Onychobaris langei Van Dyke, 1951
 Onychobaris liberta Casey, 1920
 Onychobaris mansueta Casey, 1920
 Onychobaris mentorea Casey, 1920
 Onychobaris metuens Casey, 1920
 Onychobaris millepora Casey, 1892
 Onychobaris molesta Casey, 1892
 Onychobaris mustica Casey
 Onychobaris mystica Casey, 1892
 Onychobaris nicaraguensis Solari & F., 1906
 Onychobaris oblita Casey, 1920
 Onychobaris pauperella Casey, 1892
 Onychobaris pectorosa LeConte, 1876
 Onychobaris perita Casey, 1920
 Onychobaris perversa Casey, 1920
 Onychobaris pollens Casey, 1920
 Onychobaris porcata Casey, 1892
 Onychobaris punctatissima Solari & F., 1906
 Onychobaris remota Casey, 1892
 Onychobaris rufa Linell, 1897
 Onychobaris rugicollis LeConte & J.L., 1876
 Onychobaris senecta Champion & G.C., 1909
 Onychobaris seriata (LeConte, 1857)
 Onychobaris stictica Casey, 1892
 Onychobaris subtonsa LeConte, 1876
 Onychobaris veterator Casey, 1920

References

Further reading

 
 
 

Baridinae
Articles created by Qbugbot